SV Austria Salzburg is an Austrian professional football club, based in the city of Salzburg. The club was formed in 2005 by some supporters of the original SV (Austria) Salzburg after it was renamed FC Red Bull Salzburg by its new owners, who also changed the club's colours from its traditional violet and white to red and white. The club commenced participation in the seventh tier of Austria's national league system in 2006, then rose through four successive championships to the third tier, Regionalliga West, in 2010.  In 2015, the club gained promotion to the Erste Liga, one tier below the Austrian Bundesliga, only to be relegated a year later.

History 

The original club was formed in 1933.  It was subject to a takeover by the Red Bull company in 2005.  They renamed the club FC Red Bull Salzburg, changed the team colours and claimed that it was a new team. As a concession to pleas to keep the old colours, Red Bull offered to allow the goalkeeper's socks to be purple for away matches. This was viewed as an insult by fans caused a group of supporters, known as the "Violet-Whites", to want to preserve the 72-year-old traditions of their club which they felt had been ignored by Red Bull.

On 7 October 2005, the Violet-Whites successfully registered the old club's original name "SV Austria Salzburg" and the old club emblem. For the second half of the 2005–06 season SV Austria fielded a unified team with the football section of the PSV Schwarz-Weiß Salzburg, which played in the 1. Salzburg Landesliga, the fourth tier of Austrian football, but at the end of the season the PSV members voted against continuing the link. Thus, the Violet-Whites formed a completely new team, which entered 2. Klasse Nord, the seventh tier of Austrian football, for the 2006–07 season.

The first match of the relaunched SV Austria Salzburg was played on 29 July 2006 against Lieferinger SV, another Salzburg football club. SV Austria Salzburg won 6–0, and went on to win the championship and promotion to 1. Klasse Nord. This was the first of four successive championships & promotions for SV Austria Salzburg. They won the 1. Klasse Nord in 2007–08, the 2. Salzburg Landesliga in 2008–09 and the 1. Landesliga in 2009–10. The latter secured the club's promotion to Austria's third tier of football, the Regionalliga West for the 2010–11 season. The club finished fifth in the 2010–2011 season, and eighth in the 2011–2012 season.

In the 2014–15 season, the club was promoted to the First League, the second tier of Austrian football, by winning the Regionalliga West, after a change in the rules that see an automatic promotion place for one of the Regionalligas being rotated each season.

The promotion to the First League forced the club into debt of €900,000 by November 2015, caused by an increased budget for the players as well as a security requirement to holding certain home games without spectators. The club indicated it was willing to sell up to 51 percent of its ownership of the team to an investor, as long as its name, colours, and crest would not be altered, but the Austrian Bundesliga announced that the sale of a majority of the team would be violating the league's rules. Due to breach of league licence, in November 2015 they were fined €40,000 and had 6 points deducted. This was due to their failure to adhere to the league's stadium requirements.

In recent years Austria Salzburg have struggled to climb back up to the Austrian 2nd tier, and since 2019 they compete in the Regionalliga Salzburg in the Austrian Football 3rd tier.

Club honours 

 Regionalliga West : Champions 2014, 2015 
 Landescup: Winners 2012, 2013, 2014
 1. Landesliga: Champions 2010
 2. Landesliga: Champions 2009
 1. Klasse Nord: Champions 2008
 2. Klasse Nord A: Champions 2007

League history

Gallery

Current squad

See also 
 List of fan-owned sports teams
 Phoenix club

References

External links 
 SV Austria Salzburg Official website 
 

 
Football clubs in Austria
Sports in Salzburg
Fan-owned football clubs
1933 establishments in Austria
Association football clubs established in 1933
Phoenix clubs (association football)